Louis Gallet (14 February 1835 in Valence, Drôme – 16 October 1898) was a French writer of  operatic libretti, plays, romances, memoirs, pamphlets, and innumerable articles, who is remembered above all for his adaptations of fiction —and Scripture— to provide librettos of cantatas and opera, notably by composers Georges Bizet, Camille Saint-Saëns and Jules Massenet.

Life and career
By day Gallet supported himself by a minor post in the Administration of Assistance to the Poor and positions, first as treasurer then as general administrator, at the Beaujon hospital, Paris, and other hospitals (ref. Saint-Saëns).

In 1871, Camille du Locle, the manager of the Paris Opéra-Comique, offered to produce a one-act work of Camille Saint-Saëns. He proposed as  collaborator Louis Gallet, whom Saint-Saëns did not know, and the result was the slight piece La princesse jaune; it was notable as the first japonerie on the operatic stage, Japan having only very recently been opened to Western trade and the first Japanese woodblock prints having been seen in Paris only two years previously. The two worked together harmoniously for years, and it was Saint-Saëns who recommended Gallet as music critic for the Nouvelle Revue, though he was not a musician.

For Massenet, he first provided a libretto for the oratorio Marie-Magdeleine (1872) which proved to be Massenet's first major success and the first of his four dramatic oratorios.

Georges Bizet's one-act opera Djamileh to Gallet's libretto premiered successfully, 22 May 1872, at the Opéra-Comique, Paris), but two other Bizet operas by Gallet and Edouard Blau remained incomplete at Bizet's untimely death in 1875: La coupe du roi de Thulé (1869) and a five-act Don Rodrigue (1873).

In his libretto for Massenet's Thaïs, he employed an unrhymed free verse that he termed, in Parnassien fashion, poésie melique which, like its classical Greek predecessors, was designed for a declamation with accompaniment (melodrama). In Gallet's hands, declamation rose by degrees into a freely-structured aria that was raised above the level of prose by its sonorities and syntactical patterns, formulas that were finely suited to the musical techniques of both Saint-Saëns and Massenet. After Gallet's death, Saint-Saëns wrote:I wish I knew what to say about the man himself, his unwearying goodness, his loyalty, his scrupulousness, his good humor, his originality, his continual common sense, and his intellect, alert to everything unusual and interesting.

Works

Librettos

Novels

 Les confidences d'un baiser
 Le Capitaine Satan
 Saltimbanques
 Le Petit Docteur

Travel notes

 Au pays des Cigaliers (1888)
 Fêtes cigalières et félibréennes (1891)

Others

 Notes d'un librettiste (1891)
 Guerre et Commune (1898)

Notes

Bibliography

References
Camille Saint-Saëns, "Louis Gallet"
Stanford University site: "Georges Bizet"
 "Louis Gallet: librettist of Thaïs"
Claude Calame, ""Anthropologie des poétiques grecques: La poésie mélique entre genres rituels et institutions civiques" (in French)

1835 births
1898 deaths
People from Valence, Drôme
French opera librettists
French music critics
19th-century French journalists
19th-century French novelists
French male novelists
19th-century French poets
19th-century French dramatists and playwrights
French male journalists
19th-century French male writers